Francisco António da Veiga Beirão (24 July 1841, in Lisbon – 11 November 1916, in Paço de Arcos), commonly known as Francisco da Veiga Beirão, or Veiga Beirão, was a Portuguese politician of the late period of the Constitutional Monarchy. He served as President of the Ministry (Prime Minister), being the second last before the 5 October republican coup d'état that established the Portuguese First Republic. He was a professor at the Industrial Institute and president of Lawyers Association of Lisbon. He was also a member of the Royal Academy of Sciences and of the Institut de Droit International and the Real Academía de Jurisprudencia y Legislación de Madrid. He had a law degree, from the University of Coimbra.

He started his political life in the Reformist Party and was a deputy in the Cortes from 1880 to 1904. However he maintained a certain distance from party-politics. He also served as Minister of Justice (29 February 1886 – 14 January 1890) and of Foreign Affairs (1898). He was the author of the regulating code for the creation and functioning of commercial societies in Portugal (1888).

On 22 December 1909 he was named President of the Ministry (Prime Minister) by young king Manuel II of Portugal. However, his government did not last long as it was followed by a political scandal related to the Crédito Predial Bank that implicated several of his ministers. He resigned on 26 June 1910. He was followed by António Teixeira de Sousa, the last Prime Minister of the constitutional monarchy.

After the proclamation of the Portuguese Republic on 5 October 1910 he abandoned political life and continued working as a lawyer and attorney.

See also
 History of Portugal
 History of Portugal (1834-1910)
 History of Portugal (1910-1926)
 Timeline of Portuguese history
 Politics of Portugal
 List of prime ministers of Portugal
 Prime Minister of Portugal

References
 Centre of Studies of the Political Thought

1841 births
1916 deaths
Naval ministers of Portugal
People from Lisbon
Progressive Party (Portugal) politicians
Prime Ministers of Portugal
University of Coimbra alumni
19th-century Portuguese people